The 1937 Provincial Speedway League was the second season of the Provincial League. Seven  speedway teams started the season. From the previous season's finishers, Plymouth Panthers had dropped out but Leicester, Birmingham (Hall Green) and Norwich Stars joined up. Leicester withdrew mid-season and their record was expunged. Liverpool Merseysiders also withdrew mid-season but their entry was taken over by Belle Vue. Bristol Bulldogs were the champions and moved up to the National League for the following season.

Due to the brevity of the season, teams also competed for the Provincial Trophy in a league format. Leicester had already folded before the competition started and as with the league, Belle Vue replaced Liverpool Merseysiders. Nottingham won the Provincial Trophy and completed a double by winning the Provincial League Coronation Cup.

James Stanley Hart (Stan Hart) was killed during a match at Hall Green Stadium between Birmingham and Belle Vue on 25 August. He fell during a heat and was hit by a rider behind.

Final table

M = Matches; W = Wins; D = Draws; L = Losses; Pts = Total Points

+ Liverpool scored 10 points from 11 matches, Belle Vue scored 6 from 9

Withdrawal (Record expunged) : Leicester Hounds

Leading averages (league only)

Provincial Trophy final table

M = Matches; W = Wins; D = Draws; L = Losses; Pts = Total Points

+ Liverpool scored 2 points from 6 matches, Belle Vue scored 6 from 4

National Trophy
The 1937 National Trophy was the seventh edition of the Knockout Cup. Southampton Saints won the Provincial Final round and therefore qualified for the quarter finals proper (the round when the tier one sides entered the competition).

Provincial League first qualifying round

Provincial League second qualifying round

Final

First leg

Second leg

Southampton were the National Trophy Provincial Final winners, winning on aggregate 93-73.

Coronation Cup
The 1937 Coronation Cup was a one-off competition to mark the Coronation of George VI and Elizabeth. Nottingham won the Cup.

First round

Semifinals

Final

See also
List of United Kingdom Speedway League Champions
Knockout Cup

References

Speedway Provincial League
1937 in British motorsport
1937 in speedway